

Peerage of England, Scotland and Great Britain

Dukes

|colspan=5 style="background: #fcc" align="center"|Peerage of England
|-
|Duke of Cornwall (1337)||George, Prince of Wales||1762||1820||
|-
|rowspan=2|Duke of Norfolk (1483)||Charles Howard, 10th Duke of Norfolk||1777||1786||Died
|-
|Charles Howard, 11th Duke of Norfolk||1786||1815||
|-
|Duke of Somerset (1547)||Edward Seymour, 9th Duke of Somerset||1757||1792||
|-
|Duke of Richmond (1675)||Charles Lennox, 3rd Duke of Richmond||1750||1806||
|-
|Duke of Grafton (1675)||Augustus FitzRoy, 3rd Duke of Grafton||1757||1811||
|-
|Duke of Beaufort (1682)||Henry Somerset, 5th Duke of Beaufort||1756||1803||
|-
|rowspan=3|Duke of St Albans (1684)||George Beauclerk, 3rd Duke of St Albans||1751||1786||Died
|-
|George Beauclerk, 4th Duke of St Albans||1786||1787||
|-
|Aubrey Beauclerk, 5th Duke of St Albans||1786||1802||
|-
|Duke of Bolton (1689)||Harry Powlett, 6th Duke of Bolton||1765||1794||
|-
|rowspan=2|Duke of Leeds (1694)||Thomas Osborne, 4th Duke of Leeds||1731||1789||Died
|-
|Francis Osborne, 5th Duke of Leeds||1789||1799||
|-
|Duke of Bedford (1694)||Francis Russell, 5th Duke of Bedford||1771||1802||
|-
|Duke of Devonshire (1694)||William Cavendish, 5th Duke of Devonshire||1764||1811||
|-
|Duke of Marlborough (1702)||George Spencer, 4th Duke of Marlborough||1758||1817||
|-
|rowspan=2|Duke of Rutland (1703)||Charles Manners, 4th Duke of Rutland||1779||1787||Died
|-
|John Manners, 5th Duke of Rutland||1787||1857||
|-
|colspan=5 style="background: #fcc" align="center"|Peerage of Scotland
|-
|Duke of Hamilton (1643)||Douglas Hamilton, 8th Duke of Hamilton||1769||1799||
|-
|Duke of Buccleuch (1663)||Henry Scott, 3rd Duke of Buccleuch||1751||1812||
|-
|Duke of Queensberry (1684)||William Douglas, 4th Duke of Queensberry||1778||1810||
|-
|Duke of Gordon (1684)||Alexander Gordon, 4th Duke of Gordon||1752||1827||
|-
|Duke of Argyll (1701)||John Campbell, 5th Duke of Argyll||1770||1806||
|-
|Duke of Atholl (1703)||John Murray, 4th Duke of Atholl||1774||1830||
|-
|Duke of Montrose (1707)||William Graham, 2nd Duke of Montrose||1742||1790||
|-
|Duke of Roxburghe (1707)||John Ker, 3rd Duke of Roxburghe||1755||1804||
|-
|colspan=5 style="background: #fcc" align="center"|Peerage of Great Britain
|-
|Duke of Ancaster and Kesteven (1715)||Brownlow Bertie, 5th Duke of Ancaster and Kesteven||1779||1809||
|-
|Duke of Portland (1716)||William Cavendish-Bentinck, 3rd Duke of Portland||1762||1809||
|-
|rowspan=2|Duke of Manchester (1719)||George Montagu, 4th Duke of Manchester||1762||1788||Died
|-
|William Montagu, 5th Duke of Manchester||1788||1843||
|-
|Duke of Chandos (1719)||James Brydges, 3rd Duke of Chandos||1771||1789||Died, title extinct
|-
|Duke of Dorset (1720)||John Sackville, 3rd Duke of Dorset||1769||1799||
|-
|Duke of Bridgewater (1720)||Francis Egerton, 3rd Duke of Bridgewater||1748||1803||
|-
|Duke of Newcastle (1756)||Henry Pelham-Clinton, 2nd Duke of Newcastle||1768||1794||
|-
|Duke of Gloucester and Edinburgh (1764)||Prince William Henry, Duke of Gloucester and Edinburgh||1764||1805||
|-
|rowspan=2|Duke of Northumberland (1766)||Hugh Percy, 1st Duke of Northumberland||1766||1786||Died
|-
|Hugh Percy, 2nd Duke of Northumberland||1786||1819||
|-
|Duke of Cumberland and Strathearn (1766)||Prince Henry, Duke of Cumberland and Strathearn||1766||1790||
|-
|Duke of Montagu (1766)||George Montagu, 1st Duke of Montagu||1766||1790||
|-
|Duke of York and Albany (1784)||Prince Frederick, Duke of York and Albany||1784||1827||New creation
|-
|Duke of Clarence and St Andrews (1789)||Prince William, 1st Duke of Clarence and St Andrews||1789||1830||New creation
|-
|}

Marquesses

|colspan=5 style="background: #fcc" align="center"|Peerage of England
|-
|colspan=5 align="center"|-
|-
|colspan=5 style="background: #fcc" align="center"|Peerage of Scotland
|-
|rowspan=2|Marquess of Tweeddale (1694)||George Hay, 6th Marquess of Tweeddale||1770||1787||Died
|-
|George Hay, 7th Marquess of Tweeddale||1787||1804||
|-
|Marquess of Lothian (1701)||William Kerr, 5th Marquess of Lothian||1775||1815||
|-
|Marquess of Annandale (1701)||George Vanden-Bempde, 3rd Marquess of Annandale||1730||1792||
|-
|colspan=5 style="background: #fcc" align="center"|Peerage of Great Britain
|-
|Marquess Grey (1740)||Jemima Yorke, 2nd Marchioness Grey||1740||1797||
|-
|Marquess of Rockingham (1746)||Charles Watson-Wentworth, 2nd Marquess of Rockingham||1750||1782||Died, title extinct
|-
|Marquess of Buckingham (1784)||George Nugent-Temple-Grenville, 1st Marquess of Buckingham||1784||1813||New creation
|-
|Marquess of Lansdowne (1784)||William Petty Fitzmaurice, 1st Marquess of Lansdowne||1784||1805||New creation
|-
|Marquess of Stafford (1786)||Granville Leveson-Gower, 1st Marquess of Stafford||1786||1803||New creation
|-
|Marquess Townshend (1787)||George Townshend, 1st Marquess Townshend||1787||1807||New creation
|-
|Marquess of Salisbury (1789)||James Cecil, 1st Marquess of Salisbury||1789||1823||New creation
|-
|Marquess of Bath (1789)||Thomas Thynne, 1st Marquess of Bath||1789||1796||New creation
|-
|}

Earls

|colspan=5 style="background: #fcc" align="center"|Peerage of England
|-
|rowspan=2|Earl of Shrewsbury (1442)||George Talbot, 14th Earl of Shrewsbury||1743||1787||Died
|-
|Charles Talbot, 15th Earl of Shrewsbury||1787||1827||
|-
|Earl of Derby (1485)||Edward Smith-Stanley, 12th Earl of Derby||1776||1834||
|-
|rowspan=2|Earl of Huntingdon (1529)||Francis Hastings, 10th Earl of Huntingdon||1746||1789||Died
|-
|Theophilus Henry Hastings, de jure 11th Earl of Huntingdon||1789||1804||
|-
|Earl of Pembroke (1551)||Henry Herbert, 10th Earl of Pembroke||1749||1794||
|-
|rowspan=2|Earl of Devon (1553)||William Courtenay, de jure 8th Earl of Devon||1762||1788||Died
|-
|William Courtenay, de jure 9th Earl of Devon||1788||1831||
|-
|rowspan=2|Earl of Suffolk (1603)||Thomas Howard, 14th Earl of Suffolk||1779||1783||Died
|-
|John Howard, 15th Earl of Suffolk||1783||1830||
|-
|Earl of Exeter (1605)||Brownlow Cecil, 9th Earl of Exeter||1754||1793||
|-
|rowspan=2|Earl of Salisbury (1605)||James Cecil, 6th Earl of Salisbury||1728||1780||Died
|-
|James Cecil, 7th Earl of Salisbury||1782||1823||Created Marquess of Salisbury, see above
|-
|Earl of Northampton (1618)||Spencer Compton, 8th Earl of Northampton||1763||1796||
|-
|Earl of Denbigh (1622)||Basil Feilding, 6th Earl of Denbigh||1755||1800||
|-
|Earl of Westmorland (1624)||John Fane, 10th Earl of Westmorland||1774||1841||
|-
|Earl of Peterborough (1628)||Charles Henry Mordaunt, 5th Earl of Peterborough||1779||1814||
|-
|Earl of Stamford (1628)||George Grey, 5th Earl of Stamford||1768||1819||
|-
|Earl of Winchilsea (1628)||George Finch, 9th Earl of Winchilsea||1769||1826||
|-
|Earl of Chesterfield (1628)||Philip Stanhope, 5th Earl of Chesterfield||1773||1815||
|-
|rowspan=2|Earl of Thanet (1628)||Sackville Tufton, 8th Earl of Thanet||1753||1786||Died
|-
|Sackville Tufton, 9th Earl of Thanet||1786||1825||
|-
|Earl of Sandwich (1660)||John Montagu, 4th Earl of Sandwich||1729||1792||
|-
|Earl of Essex (1661)||William Capell, 4th Earl of Essex||1743||1799||
|-
|Earl of Carlisle (1661)||Frederick Howard, 5th Earl of Carlisle||1758||1825||
|-
|Earl of Shaftesbury (1672)||Anthony Ashley-Cooper, 5th Earl of Shaftesbury||1771||1811||
|-
|Earl of Berkeley (1679)||Frederick Augustus Berkeley, 5th Earl of Berkeley||1755||1810||
|-
|Earl of Abingdon (1682)||Willoughby Bertie, 4th Earl of Abingdon||1760||1799||
|-
|Earl of Gainsborough (1682)||Henry Noel, 6th Earl of Gainsborough||1759||1799||
|-
|Earl of Plymouth (1682)||Other Windsor, 5th Earl of Plymouth||1771||1799||
|-
|rowspan=2|Earl of Scarbrough (1690)||Richard Lumley-Saunderson, 4th Earl of Scarbrough||1752||1782||Died
|-
|George Lumley-Saunderson, 5th Earl of Scarbrough||1782||1807||
|-
|rowspan=2|Earl of Rochford (1695)||William Nassau de Zuylestein, 4th Earl of Rochford||1738||1781||Died
|-
|William Nassau de Zuylestein, 5th Earl of Rochford||1781||1830||
|-
|Earl of Albemarle (1697)||William Keppel, 4th Earl of Albemarle||1772||1849||
|-
|Earl of Coventry (1697)||George Coventry, 6th Earl of Coventry||1751||1809||
|-
|Earl of Jersey (1697)||George Villiers, 4th Earl of Jersey||1769||1805||
|-
|rowspan=2|Earl Poulett (1706)||Vere Poulett, 3rd Earl Poulett||1764||1788||Died
|-
|John Poulett, 4th Earl Poulett||1788||1819||
|-
|Earl of Cholmondeley (1706)||George James Cholmondeley, 4th Earl of Cholmondeley||1770||1827||
|-
|colspan=5 style="background: #fcc" align="center"|Peerage of Scotland
|-
|rowspan=2|Earl of Crawford (1398)||George Lindsay-Crawford, 21st Earl of Crawford||1749||1781||Died
|-
|George Lindsay-Crawford, 22nd Earl of Crawford||1781||1808||
|-
|Earl of Erroll (1452)||George Hay, 16th Earl of Erroll||1778||1798||
|-
|Earl of Sutherland (1235)||Elizabeth Gordon, 19th Countess of Sutherland||1766||1839||
|-
|Earl of Rothes (1458)||Jane Elizabeth Leslie, 12th Countess of Rothes||1773||1810||
|-
|Earl of Morton (1458)||George Douglas, 16th Earl of Morton||1774||1827||
|-
|Earl of Glencairn (1488)||James Cunningham, 14th Earl of Glencairn||1775||1791||
|-
|Earl of Eglinton (1507)||Archibald Montgomerie, 11th Earl of Eglinton||1769||1796||
|-
|Earl of Cassilis (1509)||David Kennedy, 10th Earl of Cassilis||1775||1792||
|-
|rowspan=2|Earl of Caithness (1455)||John Sinclair, 11th Earl of Caithness||1779||1789||Died
|-
|James Sinclair, 12th Earl of Caithness||1789||1823||
|-
|Earl of Buchan (1469)||David Erskine, 11th Earl of Buchan||1767||1829||
|-
|Earl of Moray (1562)||Francis Stuart, 9th Earl of Moray||1767||1810||
|-
|rowspan=2|Earl of Home (1605)||Alexander Home, 9th Earl of Home||1761||1786||Died
|-
|Alexander Home, 10th Earl of Home||1786||1841||
|-
|rowspan=2|Earl of Abercorn (1606)||James Hamilton, 8th Earl of Abercorn||1744||1789||Died
|-
|John Hamilton, 9th Earl of Abercorn||1789||1818||
|-
|Earl of Strathmore and Kinghorne (1606)||John Bowes, 10th Earl of Strathmore and Kinghorne||1776||1820||
|-
|rowspan=2|Earl of Kellie (1619)||Thomas Erskine, 6th Earl of Kellie||1758||1781||Died
|-
|Archibald Erskine, 7th Earl of Kellie||1781||1795||
|-
|Earl of Haddington (1619)||Thomas Hamilton, 7th Earl of Haddington||1735||1794||
|-
|Earl of Galloway (1623)||John Stewart, 7th Earl of Galloway||1773||1806||
|-
|rowspan=2|Earl of Lauderdale (1624)||James Maitland, 7th Earl of Lauderdale||1744||1789||Died
|-
|James Maitland, 8th Earl of Lauderdale||1789||1839||
|-
|rowspan=3|Earl of Loudoun (1633)||John Campbell, 4th Earl of Loudoun||1731||1782||Died
|-
|James Mure-Campbell, 5th Earl of Loudoun||1782||1786||
|-
|Flora Campbell, 6th Countess of Loudoun||1786||1840||
|-
|rowspan=2|Earl of Kinnoull (1633)||Thomas Hay, 9th Earl of Kinnoull||1758||1787||Died
|-
|Robert Hay-Drummond, 10th Earl of Kinnoull||1787||1804||
|-
|Earl of Dumfries (1633)||Patrick McDouall-Crichton, 6th Earl of Dumfries||1769||1803||
|-
|Earl of Elgin (1633)||Thomas Bruce, 7th Earl of Elgin||1771||1841||
|-
|Earl of Traquair (1633)||Charles Stewart, 7th Earl of Traquair||1779||1827||
|-
|rowspan=2|Earl of Dalhousie (1633)||George Ramsay, 8th Earl of Dalhousie||1764||1787||Died
|-
|George Ramsay, 9th Earl of Dalhousie||1787||1838||
|-
|Earl of Findlater (1638)||James Ogilvy, 7th Earl of Findlater||1770||1811||
|-
|Earl of Leven (1641)||David Leslie, 6th Earl of Leven||1754||1802||
|-
|Earl of Dysart (1643)||Lionel Tollemache, 5th Earl of Dysart||1770||1799||
|-
|Earl of Selkirk (1646)||Dunbar Douglas, 4th Earl of Selkirk||1744||1799||
|-
|Earl of Northesk (1647)||George Carnegie, 6th Earl of Northesk||1741||1792||
|-
|Earl of Balcarres (1651)||Alexander Lindsay, 6th Earl of Balcarres||1768||1825||
|-
|Earl of Aboyne (1660)||Charles Gordon, 4th Earl of Aboyne||1732||1794||
|-
|rowspan=2|Earl of Newburgh (1660)||James Radclyffe, 4th Earl of Newburgh||1755||1786||Died
|-
|Anthony Radclyffe, 5th Earl of Newburgh||1786||1814||
|-
|Earl of Dundonald (1669)||Archibald Cochrane, 9th Earl of Dundonald||1778||1831||
|-
|Earl of Kintore (1677)||Anthony Keith-Falconer, 5th Earl of Kintore||1778||1804||
|-
|rowspan=2|Earl of Breadalbane and Holland (1677)||John Campbell, 3rd Earl of Breadalbane and Holland||1752||1782||Died
|-
|John Campbell, 4th Earl of Breadalbane and Holland||1782||1834||
|-
|Earl of Aberdeen (1682)||George Gordon, 3rd Earl of Aberdeen||1746||1801||
|-
|Earl of Dunmore (1686)||John Murray, 4th Earl of Dunmore||1752||1809||
|-
|Earl of Orkney (1696)||Mary O'Brien, 3rd Countess of Orkney||1756||1790||
|-
|Earl of Marchmont (1697)||Hugh Hume-Campbell, 3rd Earl of Marchmont||1740||1794||
|-
|rowspan=2|Earl of Hyndford (1701)||John Carmichael, 4th Earl of Hyndford||1766||1787||Died
|-
|Thomas Carmichael, 5th Earl of Hyndford||1787||1811||
|-
|rowspan=2|Earl of Stair (1703)||John Dalrymple, 5th Earl of Stair||1768||1789||Died
|-
|John Dalrymple, 6th Earl of Stair||1789||1821||
|-
|Earl of Rosebery (1703)||Neil Primrose, 3rd Earl of Rosebery||1765||1814||
|-
|Earl of Glasgow (1703)||George Boyle, 4th Earl of Glasgow||1775||1843||
|-
|rowspan=2|Earl of Portmore (1703)||Charles Colyear, 2nd Earl of Portmore||1730||1785||Died
|-
|William Colyear, 3rd Earl of Portmore||1785||1823||
|-
|Earl of Bute (1703)||John Stuart, 3rd Earl of Bute||1723||1792||
|-
|rowspan=2|Earl of Hopetoun (1703)||John Hope, 2nd Earl of Hopetoun||1742||1781||Died
|-
|James Hope-Johnstone, 3rd Earl of Hopetoun||781||1816||
|-
|Earl of Deloraine (1706)||Henry Scott, 4th Earl of Deloraine||1740||1807||
|-
|colspan=5 style="background: #fcc" align="center"|Peerage of Great Britain
|-
|Earl of Oxford and Mortimer (1711)||Edward Harley, 4th Earl of Oxford and Earl Mortimer||1755||1790||
|-
|Earl of Strafford (1711)||William Wentworth, 2nd Earl of Strafford||1739||1791||
|-
|rowspan=2|Earl Ferrers (1711)||Robert Shirley, 6th Earl Ferrers||1778||1787||Died
|-
|Robert Shirley, 7th Earl Ferrers||1787||1827||
|-
|Earl of Dartmouth (1711)||William Legge, 2nd Earl of Dartmouth||1750||1801||
|-
|Earl of Tankerville (1714)||Charles Bennet, 4th Earl of Tankerville||1767||1822||
|-
|Earl of Aylesford (1714)||Heneage Finch, 4th Earl of Aylesford||1777||1812||
|-
|Earl of Bristol (1714)||Frederick Hervey, 4th Earl of Bristol||1779||1803||
|-
|Earl of Sussex (1717)||Henry Yelverton, 3rd Earl of Sussex||1758||1799||
|-
|rowspan=2|Earl Cowper (1718)||George Clavering-Cowper, 3rd Earl Cowper||1764||1789||Died
|-
|George Clavering-Cowper, 4th Earl Cowper||1789||1799||
|-
|rowspan=2|Earl Stanhope (1718)||Philip Stanhope, 2nd Earl Stanhope||1721||1786||Died
|-
|Charles Stanhope, 3rd Earl Stanhope||1786||1816||
|-
|Earl of Harborough (1719)||Robert Sherard, 4th Earl of Harborough||1770||1799||
|-
|Earl of Macclesfield (1721)||Thomas Parker, 3rd Earl of Macclesfield||1764||1795||
|-
|rowspan=2|Earl of Pomfret (1721)||George Fermor, 2nd Earl of Pomfret||1753||1785||Died
|-
|George Fermor, 3rd Earl of Pomfret||1785||1830||
|-
|rowspan=3|Earl Waldegrave (1729)||John Waldegrave, 3rd Earl Waldegrave||1763||1784||Died
|-
|George Waldegrave, 4th Earl Waldegrave||1784||1789||Died
|-
|George Waldegrave, 5th Earl Waldegrave||1789||1794||
|-
|Earl of Ashburnham (1730)||John Ashburnham, 2nd Earl of Ashburnham||1737||1812||
|-
|Earl of Effingham (1731)||Thomas Howard, 3rd Earl of Effingham||1763||1791||
|-
|Earl of Orford (1742)||George Walpole, 3rd Earl of Orford||1751||1791||
|-
|Earl of Harrington (1742)||Charles Stanhope, 3rd Earl of Harrington||1779||1829||
|-
|Earl of Portsmouth (1743)||John Wallop, 2nd Earl of Portsmouth||1762||1797||
|-
|Earl Brooke (1746)||George Greville, 2nd Earl Brooke||1773||1816||
|-
|Earl Gower (1746)||Granville Leveson-Gower, 2nd Earl Gower||1754||1803||Created Marquess of Stafford, see above
|-
|Earl of Buckinghamshire (1746)||John Hobart, 2nd Earl of Buckinghamshire||1756||1793||
|-
|Earl Fitzwilliam (1746)||William Fitzwilliam, 2nd Earl Fitzwilliam||1756||1833||
|-
|Earl of Powis (1748)||George Herbert, 2nd Earl of Powis||1772||1801||
|-
|Earl of Egremont (1748)||George Wyndham, 3rd Earl of Egremont||1763||1837||
|-
|Earl Temple (1749)||George Nugent-Temple-Grenville, 3rd Earl Temple||1779||1813||Created Marquess of Buckingham, see above
|-
|Earl Harcourt (1749)||George Harcourt, 2nd Earl Harcourt||1777||1809||
|-
|Earl of Hertford (1750)||Francis Seymour-Conway, 1st Earl of Hertford||1750||1794||
|-
|Earl of Guilford (1752)||Francis North, 1st Earl of Guilford||1752||1790||
|-
|Earl Cornwallis (1753)||Charles Cornwallis, 2nd Earl Cornwallis||1762||1805||
|-
|Earl of Hardwicke (1754)||Philip Yorke, 2nd Earl of Hardwicke||1764||1790||
|-
|Earl of Darlington (1754)||Henry Vane, 2nd Earl of Darlington||1758||1792||
|-
|Earl Fauconberg (1756)||Henry Belasyse, 2nd Earl Fauconberg||1774||1802||
|-
|Earl of Ilchester (1756)||Henry Fox-Strangways, 2nd Earl of Ilchester||1776||1802||
|-
|rowspan=2|Earl De La Warr (1761)||William West, 3rd Earl De La Warr||1777||1783||Died
|-
|John West, 4th Earl De La Warr||1783||1795||
|-
|Earl Talbot (1761)||William Talbot, 1st Earl Talbot||1761||1782||Died; Peerage extinct
|-
|Earl of Northington (1764)||Robert Henley, 2nd Earl of Northington||1772||1786||Died; Peerage extinct
|-
|Earl of Radnor (1765)||Jacob Pleydell-Bouverie, 2nd Earl of Radnor||1776||1828||
|-
|rowspan=2|Earl Spencer (1765)||John Spencer, 1st Earl Spencer||1765||1783||Died
|-
|George Spencer, 2nd Earl Spencer||1783||1834||
|-
|Earl of Chatham (1766)||John Pitt, 2nd Earl of Chatham||1778||1835||
|-
|Earl Bathurst (1772)||Henry Bathurst, 2nd Earl Bathurst||1775||1794||
|-
|Earl of Hillsborough (1772)||Wills Hill, 1st Earl of Hillsborough||1772||1793||Created Marquess of Downshire, see above
|-
|Earl of Ailesbury (1776)||Thomas Brudenell-Bruce, 1st Earl of Ailesbury||1776||1814||
|-
|rowspan=2|Earl of Clarendon (1776)||Thomas Villiers, 1st Earl of Clarendon||1776||1786||Died
|-
|Thomas Villiers, 2nd Earl of Clarendon||1786||1824||
|-
|Earl of Mansfield (1776)||William Murray, 1st Earl of Mansfield||1776||1793||
|-
|rowspan=2|Earl of Abergavenny (1784)||George Nevill, 1st Earl of Abergavenny||1784||1785||New creation; died
|-
|Henry Nevill, 2nd Earl of Abergavenny||1785||1843||
|-
|Earl of Leicester (1784)||George Townshend, 1st Earl of Leicester||1784||1811||New creation
|-
|Earl of Lonsdale (1784)||James Lowther, 1st Earl of Lonsdale||1784||1802||New creation
|-
|Earl of Uxbridge (1784)||Henry Paget, 1st Earl of Uxbridge||1784||1812||New creation
|-
|Earl Talbot (1784)||John Chetwynd-Talbot, 1st Earl Talbot||1784||1793||New creation
|-
|Earl Grosvenor (1784)||Richard Grosvenor, 1st Earl Grosvenor||1784||1802||New creation
|-
|Earl Beaulieu (1784)||Edward Hussey-Montagu, 1st Earl Beaulieu||1784||1802||New creation
|-
|Earl Camden (1786)||Charles Pratt, 1st Earl Camden||1786||1794||New creation
|-
|Earl Howe (1788)||Richard Howe, 1st Earl Howe||1788||1799||New creation
|-
|Earl of Mount Edgcumbe (1789)||George Edgcumbe, 1st Earl of Mount Edgcumbe||1789||1795||New creation
|-
|Earl Fortescue (1789)||Hugh Fortescue, 1st Earl Fortescue||1789||1841||New creation
|-
|}

Viscounts

|colspan=5 style="background: #fcc" align="center"|Peerage of England
|-
|rowspan=2|Viscount Hereford (1550)||Edward Devereux, 12th Viscount Hereford||1760||1783||Died
|-
|George Devereux, 13th Viscount Hereford||1783||1804||
|-
|rowspan=2|Viscount Montagu (1554)||Anthony Browne, 7th Viscount Montagu||1767||1787||Died
|-
|George Browne, 8th Viscount Montagu||1787||1793||
|-
|Viscount Saye and Sele (1624)||Richard Fiennes, 6th Viscount Saye and Sele||1742||1781||Died, title extinct
|-
|Viscount Townshend (1682)||George Townshend, 4th Viscount Townshend||1764||1807||Created Marquess Townshend, see above
|-
|Viscount Weymouth (1682)||Thomas Thynne, 3rd Viscount Weymouth||1751||1796||Created Marquess of Bath, see above
|-
|colspan=5 style="background: #fcc" align="center"|Peerage of Scotland
|-
|rowspan=2|Viscount of Falkland (1620)||Lucius Cary, 7th Viscount Falkland||1730||1785||Died
|-
|Henry Thomas Cary, 8th Viscount Falkland||1785||1796||
|-
|Viscount of Stormont (1621)||David Murray, 7th Viscount of Stormont||1748||1796||
|-
|Viscount of Arbuthnott (1641)||John Arbuthnot, 6th Viscount of Arbuthnott||1756||1791||
|-
|colspan=5 style="background: #fcc" align="center"|Peerage of Great Britain
|-
|rowspan=2|Viscount Bolingbroke (1712)||Frederick St John, 2nd Viscount Bolingbroke||1751||1787||Died
|-
|George St John, 3rd Viscount Bolingbroke||1787||1824||
|-
|rowspan=2|Viscount Falmouth (1720)||Hugh Boscawen, 2nd Viscount Falmouth||1734||1782||Died
|-
|George Boscawen, 3rd Viscount Falmouth||1782||1808||
|-
|Viscount Torrington (1721)||George Byng, 4th Viscount Torrington||1750||1812||
|-
|Viscount Leinster (1747)||William FitzGerald, 2nd Viscount Leinster||1773||1804||Duke of Leinster in the Peerage of Ireland
|-
|rowspan=2|Viscount Courtenay (1762)||William Courtenay, 2nd Viscount Courtenay||1762||1788||Died
|-
|William Courtenay, 3rd Viscount Courtenay||1788||1835||
|-
|Viscount Wentworth (1762)||Thomas Noel, 2nd Viscount Wentworth||1774||1815||
|-
|rowspan=2|Viscount Dudley and Ward (1763)||John Ward, 1st Viscount Dudley and Ward||1763||1774||Died
|-
|William Ward, 3rd Viscount Dudley and Ward||1788||1823||
|-
|Viscount Maynard (1766)||Charles Maynard, 2nd Viscount Maynard||1775||1824||
|-
|rowspan=2|Viscount Hampden (1776)||Robert Hampden-Trevor, 1st Viscount Hampden||1776||1783||Died
|-
|Thomas Hampden-Trevor, 2nd Viscount Hampden||1783||1824||
|-
|rowspan=2|Viscount Sackville (1782)||George Germain, 1st Viscount Sackville||1782||1785||New creation; died
|-
|Charles Sackville-Germain, 2nd Viscount Sackville||1785||1843||
|-
|Viscount Keppel (1782)||Augustus Keppel, 1st Viscount Keppel||1782||1786||New creation; died, title extinct
|-
|Viscount Sydney (1789)||Thomas Townshend, 1st Viscount Sydney||1789||1800||New creation
|-
|}

Barons

|colspan=5 style="background: #fcc" align="center"|Peerage of England
|-
|rowspan=2|Baron le Despencer (1264)||Francis Dashwood, 11th Baron le Despencer||1763||1781||Died, Barony fell into abeyance
|- 
|Thomas Stapleton, 12th Baron le Despencer||1788||1831||Abeyance terminated
|- 
|Baron Clinton (1299)||Margaret Rolle, 15th Baroness Clinton||1760||1781||Died, title succeeded by the Earl of Orford
|- 
|Baron Ferrers of Chartley (1299)||George Townshend, 17th Baron Ferrers of Chartley||1770||1811||Created Earl of Leicester, see above
|- 
|Baron de Clifford (1299)||Edward Southwell, 21st Baron de Clifford||1777||1832||
|- 
|Baron Audley (1313)||George Thicknesse, 19th Baron Audley||1777||1818||
|- 
|Baron Willoughby de Eresby (1313)||Priscilla Bertie, 21st Baroness Willoughby de Eresby||1780||1828||Abeyance terminated
|- 
|rowspan=2|Baron Dacre (1321)||Thomas Barrett-Lennard, 17th Baron Dacre||1755||1786||Died
|- 
|Trevor Charles Roper, 18th Baron Dacre||1786||1794||
|- 
|Baron Botreaux (1368)||Elizabeth Rawdon, 16th Baroness Botreaux||1789||1808||Title previously held by the Earls of Huntingdon
|- 
|rowspan=2|Baron Stourton (1448)||William Stourton, 16th Baron Stourton||1753||1781||Died
|- 
|Charles Stourton, 17th Baron Stourton||1781||1816||
|- 
|Baron Willoughby de Broke (1491)||John Peyto-Verney, 14th Baron Willoughby de Broke||1752||1816||
|- 
|Baron Paget (1552)||Henry Paget, 9th Baron Paget||1769||1812||Created Earl of Uxbridge, see above
|-
|Baron St John of Bletso (1559)||Henry St John, 13th Baron St John of Bletso||1767||1805||
|-
|Baron Howard de Walden (1597)||John Griffin, 4th Baron Howard de Walden||1784||1797||Abeyance terminated
|-
|Baron Petre (1603)||Robert Petre, 9th Baron Petre||1742||1801||
|-
|rowspan=2|Baron Saye and Sele (1603)||Thomas Twisleton, 13th Baron Saye and Sele||1781||1788||Died
|-
|Gregory Eardley-Twisleton-Fiennes, 14th Baron Saye and Sele||1788||1844||
|-
|Baron Arundell of Wardour (1605)||Henry Arundell, 8th Baron Arundell of Wardour||1756||1808||
|-
|rowspan=2|Baron Dormer (1615)||John Dormer, 7th Baron Dormer||1761||1785||Died
|-
|Charles Dormer, 8th Baron Dormer||1785||1804||
|-
|rowspan=3|Baron Teynham (1616)||Henry Roper, 10th Baron Teynham||1727||1781||Died
|-
|Henry Roper, 11th Baron Teynham||1781||1786||
|-
|Henry Roper, 12th Baron Teynham||1786||1800||
|-
|Baron Craven (1627)||William Craven, 6th Baron Craven||1769||1791||
|-
|Baron Strange (1628)||Charlotte Murray, 8th Baroness Strange||1764||1805||
|-
|Baron Leigh (1643)||Edward Leigh, 5th Baron Leigh||1749||1786||Died, title extinct
|-
|Baron Byron (1643)||William Byron, 5th Baron Byron||1736||1798||
|-
|rowspan=2|Baron Clifford of Chudleigh (1672)||Hugh Clifford, 4th Baron Clifford of Chudleigh||1732||1783||Died
|-
|Hugh Clifford, 5th Baron Clifford of Chudleigh||1783||1793||
|-
|colspan=5 style="background: #fcc" align="center"|Peerage of Scotland
|-
|Lord Somerville (1430)||James Somerville, 14th Lord Somerville||1765||1796||
|-
|Lord Forbes (1442)||James Forbes, 16th Lord Forbes||1761||1804||
|-
|rowspan=2|Lord Saltoun (1445)||George Fraser, 15th Lord Saltoun||1748||1781||Died
|-
|Alexander Fraser, 16th Lord Saltoun||1781||1793||
|-
|rowspan=3|Lord Gray (1445)||John Gray, 11th Lord Gray||1738||1782||Died
|-
|Charles Gray, 12th Lord Gray||1782||1786||Died
|-
|William John Gray, 13th Lord Gray||1782||1807||
|-
|Lord Sinclair (1449)||Charles St Clair, 13th Lord Sinclair||1782||1863||Peerage previously under attainder
|-
|Lord Cathcart (1460)||William Cathcart, 10th Lord Cathcart||1776||1843||
|-
|rowspan=2|Lord Sempill (1489)||John Sempill, 13th Lord Sempill||1746||1782||Died
|-
|Hugh Sempill, 14th Lord Sempill||1782||1830||
|-
|rowspan=2|Lord Elphinstone (1509)||Charles Elphinstone, 10th Lord Elphinstone||1757||1781||Died
|-
|John Elphinstone, 11th Lord Elphinstone||1781||1794||
|-
|Lord Torphichen (1564)||James Sandilands, 9th Lord Torphichen||1765||1815||
|-
|Lord Lindores (1600)||John Leslie, 8th Lord Lindores||1775||1813||
|-
|Lord Colville of Culross (1604)||John Colville, 8th Lord Colville of Culross||1770||1811||
|-
|rowspan=2|Lord Blantyre (1606)||Alexander Stuart, 10th Lord Blantyre||1776||1783||Died
|-
|Robert Walter Stuart, 11th Lord Blantyre||1783||1830||
|-
|Lord Cranstoun (1609)||James Cranstoun, 8th Lord Cranstoun||1778||1796||
|-
|Lord Aston of Forfar (1627)||Walter Aston, 8th Lord Aston of Forfar||1763||1805||
|-
|rowspan=2|Lord Fairfax of Cameron (1627)||Thomas Fairfax, 6th Lord Fairfax of Cameron||1710||1781||Died
|-
|Robert Fairfax, 7th Lord Fairfax of Cameron||1781||1793||
|-
|Lord Napier (1627)||Francis Napier, 8th Lord Napier||1775||1823||
|-
|Lord Reay (1628)||Hugh Mackay, 6th Lord Reay||1768||1797||
|-
|Lord Kirkcudbright (1633)||John Maclellan, 8th Lord Kirkcudbright||1762||1801||
|-
|rowspan=2|Lord Forrester (1633)||Caroline Cockburn of Ormistoun, 8th Lady Forrester||1763||1784||Died
|-
|Anna Maria Cockburn of Ormistoun, 9th Lady Forrester||1784||1808||
|-
|Lord Banff (1642)||William Ogilvy, 8th Lord Banff||1771||1803||
|-
|rowspan=2|Lord Elibank (1643)||George Murray, 6th Lord Elibank||1778||1785||Died
|-
|Alexander Murray, 7th Lord Elibank||1785||1820||
|-
|rowspan=2|Lord Belhaven and Stenton (1647)||Robert Hamilton, 6th Lord Belhaven and Stenton||1777||1784||
|-
|William Hamilton, 7th Lord Belhaven and Stenton||1784||1814||
|-
|rowspan=3|Lord Rollo (1651)||John Rollo, 6th Lord Rollo||1763||1783||Died
|-
|James Rollo, 7th Lord Rollo||1783||1784||Died
|-
|John Rollo, 8th Lord Rollo||1784||1786||
|-
|rowspan=4|Lord Ruthven of Freeland (1650)||Isobel Ruthven, 4th Lady Ruthven of Freeland||1722||1783||Died
|-
|James Ruthven, 5th Lord Ruthven of Freeland||1783||1783||Died
|-
|James Ruthven, 6th Lord Ruthven of Freeland||1783||1789||Died
|-
|James Ruthven, 7th Lord Ruthven of Freeland||1789||1853||
|-
|Lord Bellenden (1661)||John Ker Bellenden, 5th Lord Bellenden||1753||1796||
|-
|Lord Kinnaird (1682)||George Kinnaird, 7th Lord Kinnaird||1767||1805||
|-
|}

References

 

1780
1780s in England
1780s in Ireland
1780s in Scotland
Peers
Peers
Peers
Peers
Peers
Peers
18th-century nobility